At 244 metres, Beaminster Down is one of the highest hills in West Dorset, England.

Location 
Beaminster Down is common land on the Dorset Downs and overlooks the steep scarp slope above the town of Beaminster, which is about a mile and a half to the southwest. The hill is crossed by 2 long-distance trails, 2 minor roads and several other tracks.

History 
There is evidence of prehistoric settlement on in the form of tumuli to the northeast. Grenade practice took place in the sandbagged, zig-zag trenches on Beaminster Down during the Second World War.

References 

Beaminster
Hills of Dorset